Marvin Thiel (born 29 January 1995) is a German footballer who plays as an attacking midfielder for Regionalliga Nord side VfB Lübeck.

References

External links
 

1995 births
Living people
German footballers
Sportspeople from Lübeck
Footballers from Schleswig-Holstein
Association football midfielders
VfB Lübeck players
SC Preußen Münster players
Regionalliga players
3. Liga players